Jacek Gollob (born 27 October 1969 in Bydgoszcz, Poland) is a former motorcycle speedway rider from Poland, who has twice won the individual Polish Championship (in 1998 and 2000), and has also won the team and pairs championships several times.

For his sport achievements, he received: 
 Golden Cross of Merit in 2000.

His younger brother Tomasz is also a speedway rider.

Speedway Grand Prix results

Career

Speedway World Team Cup
1994 - Vice-World Champion (4 points)
1995 - 6th place (1 point)
1998 - 4th place (0 points)

European Club Champions' Cup
1998 - European Champion (6 points)

Individual Polish Championship
1991 - 13th place
1995 - 8th place
1996 - 14th place
1997 - 5th place
1998 - Polish Champion
1999 - 4th place
2000 - Polish Champion
2001 - 12th place
2005 - 3rd place

Polish Pairs Championship
1992 - 2nd place
1993 - Polish Champion
1994 - Polish Champion
1995 - Polish Champion
1996 - Polish Champion
1997 - Polish Champion
1998 - 2nd place
2001 - 7th place
2002 - Polish Champion
2003 - 4th place

Team Polish Championship
1992 - Polish Champion
1993 - Vice-Polish Champion
1995 - 3rd place
1997 - Polish Champion
1998 - Polish Champion
1999 - Polish Champion
2000 - Vice-Polish Champion
2002 - Polish Champion
2003 - 3rd place
2004 - Polish Champion
2005 - Polish Champion

Golden Helmet (Poland)
1996 - Winner
1998 - Winner
2002 - 2nd place

See also
List of Speedway Grand Prix riders

References

1969 births
Living people
Polish speedway riders
Polish speedway champions
Sportspeople from Bydgoszcz
Polonia Bydgoszcz riders